Elections to Stirling Council were held on 4 May 2017, the same day as the 31 other local authorities in Scotland. The election used the seven wards created under the Local Governance (Scotland) Act 2004, with 23 councillors being elected, an increase of 1 from 2012. Each ward elected either 3 or 4 members, using the STV electoral system. Following the Fifth Electoral Review by the Local Government Boundary Commission for Scotland, minor changes were made to several of the ward boundaries and one additional Councillor was added moving the total number of Councillors from twenty-two to twenty-three.

The election saw the Scottish Conservative and Unionist Party increased their representation on the council by five and significantly increase their vote share. The SNP retained their nine seats (though lost the council seat they had won in a 2015 by-election) and the Scottish Green Party retained their one seat. The Scottish Labour Party saw their representation on the Council drop by four seats and the Scottish Liberal Democrats and all independent candidates failed to win any seats. 
 
Following the 2012 election a coalition had been formed between the Labour Party and the Conservatives which replaced the previous SNP minority administration. In the aftermath of the 2017 election a new coalition was agreed between the SNP and Labour with Labour Councillor Christine Simpson becoming Provost of Stirling and the SNP's Graham Houston becoming depute convener of the council.

2017 Results

Note: "Votes" are the first preference votes. The net gain/loss and percentage changes relate to the result of the previous Scottish local elections on 3 May 2007. This may differ from other published sources showing gain/loss relative to seats held at dissolution of Scotland's councils.

Ward results

Trossachs and Teith
2012: 2xSNP; 1xCon
2017: 2xCon; 1xSNP
2012-2017 Change: 1 Con gain from SNP

Forth and Endrick
2012: 2xSNP; 1xCon
2017: 2xCon; 1xSNP
2012-2017 Change: 1 Con gain from SNP

Dunblane and Bridge of Allan
2012: 1xSNP; 1xCon; 1xLab; 1xGreen
2017: 2xCon; 1xSNP; 1xGreen
2012-2017 Change: 1 Con gain from Lab

Stirling North
2017: 2xSNP; 1xCon; 1xLab
2012-2017 Change: New ward

Stirling West
2012: 1xLab; 1xSNP; 1xCon
2017: 1xCon; 1xSNP; 1xLab
2012-2017 Change: No change

Stirling East
2012: 2xLab; 1xSNP
2017: 1xCon; 1xLab; 1xSNP
2012-2017: Change: 1 Con gain from Lab

Bannockburn
2012: 2xLab; 1xSNP
2017: 2xSNP; 1xLab
2012-2017 Change: 1 SNP gain from Lab

Changes between 2017 and 2022

‡On 17 May 2017, Robert Davies (Forth and Endrick) was suspended from the Scottish Conservative party over potentially offensive Twitter posts. He was reinstated on 21 August 2017. However, on 29 September 2017, Robert Davies resigned from the Conservative group at a council meeting and subsequently had his Conservative party membership terminated. He now sits as an independent councillor.
‡‡On 5 August 2020, it was reported that Maureen Bennison (Bannockburn) had resigned from the Scottish National Party, due to bullying, sexism and party in-fighting, to become an Independent. It was reported in her letter to her former group leader and current council leader, Cllr Scott Farmer (Stirling West) that: “This has been an extremely difficult decision, but it is the only principled course of action left to me in regrettable circumstances.
‡‡‡On 12 February 2021, Forth and Endrick SNP Cllr Graham Lambie died suddenly. A by-election was held in due course, where Conservative Jane Hutchison was elected.

References

External links
candidates standing for election 2017

External links

2017
2017 Scottish local elections